Sdot Micha Airbase is an Israeli Air Force (IAF) nuclear missile base and depot, whose existence Israel neither confirms nor denies. It is situated in the center of Israel, halfway from Jerusalem to the Mediterranean Sea and extends nearly 13 km from southeast to northwest. The center of the base is located 1.5 km north of Moshav Sdot Micha.

Name
The secret airbase has been called many names. It is most commonly called by sources as Sdot Micha Airbase due to its proximity to Moshav Sdot Micha, and less commonly Zechariah Airbase (including different spelling), due to its proximity to Moshav Zechariah. or Kanaf 2 Airbase (literally Air Wing 2 Airbase).

In July 2017 the IDF temporarily uncovered the name of the airforce's 11th and secret airforce base called Sdot HaElah, but after the press had picked it up, it disappeared again from their website. Sdot Micha is located in the Valley of Elah, ( Emek HaElah in Hebrew).

A 2005 official Israeli document regarding the Privatization of the Military Industry of Israel Ltd. later renamed IMI Systems (Resolution no.  M'Kh/24 of the Ministerial Committee on Privatization Affairs dated 28.08.2005) states: "IMI's rights in part of the land division known as "Area 209" designated for the "Arrow" battery were sold by IMI to the Ministry of Defense under an agreement dated May 10, 2005." In the official documents published at the time of the sale of IMI Systems to Elbit Systems (Resolution No. M'Kh/2 of the Ministerial Committee on Privatization of 23.12.2013) the base is referred to again as Area 209 (in Hebrew שטח אש 209). A restricted airspace and  restricted military area covering an area of 12,550 dunams in the Mateh Yehuda Regional Council.  The area was allocated to the Ministry of Defense by Israel Land Authority.

Missiles

Nuclear missiles, positions
It is believed that the base is a missile launch facility for nuclear-tipped Jericho 2 IRBMs and probably Jericho 3 ICBMs. Satellite images show these launch areas for mobile missiles very explicitly, which is part of their deterrence.

The roads for the mobile missile systems are in between ridges of hills, which has the advantage that the missile bunkers could be dug into the limestone hills around and only need massive doors to protect them from nuclear explosions - direct hits excluded. The missile sites are also hidden there and cannot to be seen from the outside.

Anti-missile system
According to Jane's Defence Weekly, Sdot Micha is also a location for the new Arrow 3 ABM, designed to intercept (nuclear) missiles coming from Iran. This is a joint venture of Israel and the United States and has been deployed there in the beginning of 2017. Satellite photos show the construction of four bunkers capable to withstand nuclear explosions. In each bunker a mobile launcher with six Arrow 3 missiles can be deployed. The US have accidentally published where the exact locations of the bunkers are: .

Related nearby bases
All larger missiles of Israel are built in the Israel Aerospace Industries (IAI) MLM Division missile plant in Be'er Ya'akov, 20 km northwest to the base. Northwest near the base is also Tel Nof Airbase where F-15 jets can be equipped with nuclear bombs probably stored in the depot of Sdot Micha.

Units
IAF 2nd Wing
150th Squadron Jericho IRBM / ICBM
199th Squadron Jericho IRBM / ICBM
248th Squadron Jericho IRBM / ICBM
4 launchers with six Arrow 3 missiles each

History
The base was established in 1962 on the land of the depopulated Palestinian Arab village of Al-Burayj.

See also
Nuclear weapons and Israel

References

Rocket launch sites
Israeli Air Force bases
Israeli nuclear development